Helsinge station is a railway station serving the town of Helsinge in North Zealand, Denmark.

Helsinge station is located on the Gribskov Line from Hillerød to Tisvildeleje. The station was opened in 1897 with the opening of the Kagerup-Helsinge section of the Gribskov Line. The train services are operated by the railway company Lokaltog which runs frequent local train services between Tisvildeleje station and Hillerød station.

See also
 List of railway stations in Denmark

References

External links

 Lokaltog

Railway stations opened in 1897
Railway stations in the Capital Region of Denmark
Railway stations in Denmark opened in the 19th century